Controversies have surrounded dedicated cycling routes in cities. Some critics of bikeways argue that the focus should instead be placed on educating cyclists in road safety, and others that safety is better served by using the road space for parking. There is debate over whether cycle tracks are an effective factor to encourage cycling or whether other factors are at play. Opponents of cycle tracks often cite fallacies such as the motor tax fallacy to argue against safe cycling infrastructure or other measures to increase cycling levels.

Context 

Some detractors argue that one must be careful in interpreting the operation of dedicated or segregated bikeways/cycle facilities across different designs and contexts; what works for the Netherlands will not necessarily work elsewhere. Proponents argue that segregated cycle facilities have been implemented in many jurisdictions and are both popular and safe.

Other countries may have different common urban designs, such as sprawling suburbs, and different cycling cultures where riders may ride bicycles with a wider range of gears and like to travel more quickly, such as those who cycle regularly for sport and exercise, who may choose to ride to incorporate some aerobic exercise into their day. So, while a sidepath system may work for slower cyclists, detractors argue, they might not work for cyclists using faster bicycle types who cannot use such a system safely at their higher normal cycling speeds. However, this is contradicted by members of the Royal Dutch Cycling Union, who state that Dutch competitive cyclists have no problems with training in the Netherlands. The Danish Roads Directorate state that the cycle track system "functions best when cyclists travel at relatively low speeds" but what is meant by 'relatively low speeds' is not made clear. There are instances where cycle tracks / sidepaths can accommodate fast cycling as evidenced in this video of a velomobile on a Dutch cycle track.

As more cycle tracks are built in North American cities, more research is being conducted on the uptake and safety of cycle tracks. North American cities that have recently installed cycle tracks have seen significant growth in cyclists using these roads. It is useful, therefore, to use North American examples of cycle tracks/side paths and compare them to similar roads used by cyclists. This will provide better data using cyclists on similar terrain and presumably similar bicycles and experience.

Cycling activists in favour of vehicular cycling have opposed cycle tracks and paths on the principle that they might not be created with the "fast cyclist type" in mind. The UK's Sustrans guidelines for the National Cycle Network are based on recreational use with a design user who is an unaccompanied twelve-year-old. The Dublin Transportation Office has advertised their cycle facilities as being based on an unaccompanied ten-year-old design user. This raises the issue of what happens if different cyclist types find themselves forced onto such devices either by legal coercion or as a result of motorist aggression. This issue is captured in a 1996 review of the Sustrans approach from the Proceedings of the Institution of Civil Engineers. The fast cycle commuter must not be driven off the highway onto a route that is designed for a 12-year-old or a novice on a leisure trip, because if that happens, the whole attempt to enlarge the use of the bicycle will have failed

War on Cars 
Some opponents of cycle infrastructure or cycling in general argue that someone - such as a local government or national government - is fighting a "war on cars" within their area. A commentator in Portland, Oregon argues that the city is fighting a "war on cars" the "experiment has failed" due to falling cycling numbers. The libertarian e-magazine Spiked argues that there is a "war on cars" active in the UK and that this is a 'war on ordinary people'. They argue that environmentalists 'would like to ban cars altogether' and that 'in the age of Net Zero the car is public enemy No.1'. They argue that the Greens 'seem blissfully unaware' of the necessity of cars. They argue that people 'just like [cars]'. This is not a new phenomenon and not restricted to online commentators. For example, in 2010, after winning election, Toronto Mayor Rob Ford, called ending the "war on cars" a top priority. In 2014, the magazine Toronto Life argued that Ford was waging a "war on all forms of transportation except cars".

Some proponents of alternative transport to the car argue that there is no "war on cars". This framing 'implies motorists are victims of violent assaults' and the 'complaints are unfounded'.

Maintenance 

Facilities must be made wide enough for the street sweepers and snow plows typically used in a locale, or the locale will need to ensure that they are regularly swept or plowed by machines that will fit.

Some locales have issues with road debris in the cycle paths, such as Milton Keynes, UK, finding that cycle path users are seven times more likely to get punctures than are road cyclists. In Ireland some cyclists have demanded simultaneous commitment to maintenance and sweeping as cycle paths are built. 

In areas subject to high leaf-fall in autumn, or high snowfall in winter, any cycle facilities must be subject to regular clearing if they are to remain usable. Danish guidance specifies three different categories of cycle track. Category "A" tracks must be kept clear of snow 24 hours a day, category "B" tracks are swept or cleared daily, and category "C" receive less regular winter maintenance. In 2007 the city of Copenhagen spent DKK 9.9 million (US$1.72 million, €1.33 million) annually on maintaining its cycle track network. German federal law requires local authorities to declassify cycle tracks that do not conform to strict design and maintenance criteria. In the UK, facilities for non-motorized traffic are not normally salted or gritted in icy conditions, potentially making them dangerous or unrideable.

Cycle lanes avoid this problem, as they are part of the road and can be easily accessed by maintenance vehicles operating on that road, incurring no extra cost. They only become filled with debris if the road is not maintained or the lane is purposely avoided.

Tracks used at night can be illuminated by conventional means, or by paving with glowing material.

Usage 

There are many factors, such as cycle tracks and other cycling infrastructure, which contribute to cycling levels. A number of cities have demonstrated that particular cycle tracks will increase bike traffic on those routes, as shown, for example, in Montreal, New York City and Copenhagen. Bike usage increased by 40% in areas of Montreal where the city invested in bike paths and lanes. In Copenhagen bike traffic increased by about 20% because of the construction of cycle tracks. The construction of separated bike lanes on Dunsmuir Street and Viaduct in Vancouver, Canada, saw bike traffic volumes on the street more than double from before the construction. NYC likewise saw cycling rates nearly triple on weekdays and doubled on weekends when the bike path was installed alongside Prospect Park West.

Seville, Spain, is an example of what is possible on a city scale when a large investment is made in cycling infrastructure over a short period of time. In 2006 there were around 6000 bike trips made daily in the city of around 700,000. By 2009 there were about 50,000 daily bike trips. During those three years 8 urban bike paths totaling 70 km were built; the city centre was closed to motorised traffic; school projects were funded to create safe school paths; traffic calming measures were provided in school districts and the bicycle sharing system ‘Sevici’ was launched. The combination of all these factors helped to create a dramatic change in cycling rates.

After a certain trip modal share it may take more than just installing cycle tracks to create large increases in cycle rates. Cycling rates in the Netherlands peaked in the 1960s and dropped dramatically until the mid-1970s. The decline in bicycle use was "not only caused by mass motorization but also by the related, fairly unco-ordinated process of urbanization and by scores of social, spatial and economic developments", such as a decrease in population density and increased travel distances. The bicycle was almost completely left out of the national government's vision. Certain cities, however, such as Amsterdam and Eindhoven, were slowly implementing more bicycle-positive policies: for example, bike-only streets and allowing cyclists to ignore one way streets. Throughout the 70s cycling rates increased, but the investments in bike paths made in the subsequent period had less effect. Between the late 1980s and early 1990s the Netherlands spent 1.5 billion guilders (US$945 million) on cycling infrastructure, yet cycling levels stayed practically the same.

When the flagship Delft Bicycle Route project was evaluated, the Institute for Road Safety Research claimed that the results were "not very positive: bicycle use had not increased, neither had the road safety. A route network of bicycle facilities has, apparently, no added value for bicycle use or road safety". The study by Louisse, C.J. et al. however, did find that "[a]lthough the total number of victims among cyclists did not decline, the percentage of fatalities and severely injured did drop dramatically." A more comprehensive policy change in addition to bicycle routes, on the other hand, helped to raise the cycling rates in Groningen where 75% of all traffic is by bike or foot. Groningen focused on land use policy, city planning and economic
policy changes to achieve very high cycling rates.

In the UK, a ten-year study of the effect of cycle facilities in eight towns and cities found no evidence that they had resulted in any diversion from other transport modes.

In some locales bike traffic increases first and bike paths and lanes are installed in order to catch up to the demand. For instance, bike planning in Davis, California was driven by the prior existence of a "dramatic volume" of cyclists in the 1960s. Research on the German bicycle boom of the 1980s paints a picture of German local authorities struggling to keep up with the growth of cycling rather than this growth being driven by their interventions. In relation to the UK, it has been argued that locally high levels of cycling are more likely to result from factors other than cycle facilities. These include an existing cycling culture and historically high levels of cycle use, compact urban forms, lack of hills and lack of barriers such as high speed intersections.

However, Pucher and Buehler, U.S.-based researchers, have stated that "the provision of separate cycling facilities" appears to be one of the keys to the achieving of high levels of cycling in the Netherlands, Denmark and Germany. Furthermore, urban planners in some cities in the U.S. have started to use predictive analytics to estimate the extent to which usage of proposed bicycle paths will improve health outcomes in specific neighborhoods.

Segregating cyclists 
From the advent of the mass-motoring until today, many cycle tracks have been constructed so bicycles could be prohibited from the main roadway as cyclists have been seen as an obstruction to the free flow of motor traffic.

In 1996 the UK Cyclists' Touring Club (now known as Cycling UK) and the Institute of Highways and Transportation jointly produced a set of Cycle-Friendly Infrastructure guidelines that placed segregated cycling facilities at the bottom of the hierarchy of measures designed to promote cycling. However, since 1996, Cycling UK has changed this position and now fully supports physical separation from motor traffic and pedestrians (i.e. protected cycle lanes and cycle tracks) as effective measures for providing cycle-friendly infrastructure. They argue that people 'prefer, value and use off-street bike paths' among other measures which reduce interaction with motor traffic. More recent guidance from Cycling UK states that cycle tracks should be provided along dual carriageways and inter-urban roads. In the Space for Cycling document, Cycling UK says that cycle lanes 'are usually not good enough to make cycling safe and normal for everyone'.

Planners at the Directorate Infrastructure Traffic and Transport in Amsterdam place cyclists and motorists together on roads with speed limits at or below , and segregate them through bicycle lanes at higher limits. This is in a context where most of the measures prioritised by Cycle-Friendly Infrastructure (HGV restrictions, area-wide traffic calming, speed limit enforcement etc.) are already in place – see Utility cycling for more detail.

Cost
A common myth in the UK is the motor tax fallacy. Some opponents of safe cycling infrastructure argue that cyclists do not pay a road tax and money used to fund the roads should not be directed to improving the safety of cyclists. However, all roads in the UK are funded from general taxation and road tax has not existed in the UK since 1936. Vehicle excise and fuel duty go directly into the consolidated fund - which funds all government activities and public services in the UK.

See also
 Bicycle transportation planning and engineering
 Cyclability
 Cycling infrastructure
 Bikeway safety

References

External links
Critiques of bikeways The Vehicular Cyclist
Facility of the Month by the Warrington Cycle Campaign
Weird cycle lanes of Brighton – short and strange cycle lanes in Brighton
Vassar Street critique – a detailed look at a sidepath design in Cambridge, Massachusetts

Road safety
Cycling infrastructure
Cycling safety
Cycling controversies
Cycleways